A growth factor is a naturally occurring substance capable of stimulating cell proliferation, wound healing, and occasionally cellular differentiation. Usually it is a secreted protein or a steroid hormone. Growth factors are important for regulating a variety of cellular processes.

Growth factors typically act as signaling molecules between cells. Examples are cytokines and hormones that bind to specific receptors on the surface of their target cells.

They often promote cell differentiation and maturation, which varies between growth factors. For example, epidermal growth factor (EGF) enhances osteogenic differentiation (osteogenesis or bone formation), while fibroblast growth factors and vascular endothelial growth factors stimulate blood vessel differentiation (angiogenesis).

Comparison to cytokines 
Growth factor is sometimes used interchangeably among scientists with the term cytokine. Historically, cytokines were associated with hematopoietic (blood and lymph forming) cells and immune system cells (e.g., lymphocytes and tissue cells from spleen, thymus, and lymph nodes). For the circulatory system and bone marrow in which cells can occur in a liquid suspension and not bound up in solid tissue, it makes sense for them to communicate by soluble, circulating protein molecules.   However, as different lines of research converged, it became clear that some of the same signaling proteins which the hematopoietic and immune systems use were also being used by all sorts of other cells and tissues, during development and in the mature organism.

While growth factor implies a positive effect on cell proliferation, cytokine is a neutral term with respect to whether a molecule affects proliferation. While some cytokines can be growth factors, such as G-CSF and GM-CSF, others have an inhibitory effect on cell growth or cell proliferation. Some cytokines, such as Fas ligand, are used as "death" signals; they cause target cells to undergo programmed cell death or apoptosis.

The nerve growth factor (NGF) was first discovered by Rita Levi-Montalcini, which won her a Nobel Prize in Physiology or Medicine.

List of classes 

Individual growth factor proteins tend to occur as members of larger families of structurally and evolutionarily related proteins.  There are many families, some of which are listed below:
 Adrenomedullin (AM)
 Angiopoietin (Ang)
 Autocrine motility factor
 Bone morphogenetic proteins (BMPs)
 Ciliary neurotrophic factor family
 Ciliary neurotrophic factor (CNTF)
 Leukemia inhibitory factor (LIF)
 Interleukin-6 (IL-6)
 Colony-stimulating factors
 Macrophage colony-stimulating factor (M-CSF)
 Granulocyte colony-stimulating factor (G-CSF)
 Granulocyte macrophage colony-stimulating factor (GM-CSF)
 Epidermal growth factor (EGF)
 Ephrins
 Ephrin A1
 Ephrin A2
 Ephrin A3
 Ephrin A4
 Ephrin A5
 Ephrin B1
 Ephrin B2
 Ephrin B3
 Erythropoietin (EPO)
 Fibroblast growth factor (FGF)
 Fibroblast growth factor 1(FGF1)
 Fibroblast growth factor 2(FGF2)
 Fibroblast growth factor 3(FGF3)
 Fibroblast growth factor 4(FGF4)
 Fibroblast growth factor 5(FGF5)
 Fibroblast growth factor 6(FGF6)
 Fibroblast growth factor 7(FGF7)
 Fibroblast growth factor 8(FGF8)
 Fibroblast growth factor 9(FGF9)
 Fibroblast growth factor 10(FGF10)
 Fibroblast growth factor 11(FGF11)
 Fibroblast growth factor 12(FGF12)
 Fibroblast growth factor 13(FGF13)
 Fibroblast growth factor 14(FGF14)
 Fibroblast growth factor 15(FGF15)
 Fibroblast growth factor 16(FGF16)
 Fibroblast growth factor 17(FGF17)
 Fibroblast growth factor 18(FGF18)
 Fibroblast growth factor 19(FGF19)
 Fibroblast growth factor 20(FGF20)
 Fibroblast growth factor 21(FGF21)
 Fibroblast growth factor 22(FGF22)
 Fibroblast growth factor 23(FGF23)
 Foetal Bovine Somatotrophin (FBS)
 GDNF family of ligands
 Glial cell line-derived neurotrophic factor (GDNF)
 Neurturin
 Persephin
 Artemin
 Growth differentiation factor-9 (GDF9)
 Hepatocyte growth factor (HGF)
 Hepatoma-derived growth factor (HDGF)
 Insulin
 Insulin-like growth factors
 Insulin-like growth factor-1 (IGF-1)
 Insulin-like growth factor-2 (IGF-2)
Interleukins
 IL-1- Cofactor for IL-3 and IL-6. Activates T cells.
 IL-2 – T-cell growth factor. Stimulates IL-1 synthesis. Activates B-cells and NK cells.
 IL-3 – Stimulates production of all non-lymphoid cells.
 IL-4 – Growth factor for activated B cells, resting T cells, and mast cells.
 IL-5 – Induces differentiation of activated B cells and eosinophils.
 IL-6 – Stimulates Ig synthesis. Growth factor for plasma cells.
 IL-7 – Growth factor for pre-B cells.
 Keratinocyte growth factor (KGF)
 Migration-stimulating factor (MSF)
 Macrophage-stimulating protein (MSP), also known as hepatocyte growth factor-like protein (HGFLP)
 Myostatin (GDF-8)
 Neuregulins
 Neuregulin 1 (NRG1)
 Neuregulin 2 (NRG2)
 Neuregulin 3 (NRG3)
 Neuregulin 4 (NRG4)
 Neurotrophins
 Brain-derived neurotrophic factor (BDNF)
 Nerve growth factor (NGF)
 Neurotrophin-3 (NT-3)
 Neurotrophin-4 (NT-4)
 Placental growth factor (PGF)
 Platelet-derived growth factor (PDGF)
 Renalase (RNLS) – Anti-apoptotic survival factor
 T-cell growth factor (TCGF)
 Thrombopoietin (TPO)
 Transforming growth factors
 Transforming growth factor alpha (TGF-α)
 Transforming growth factor beta (TGF-β)
 Tumor necrosis factor-alpha (TNF-α)
 Vascular endothelial growth factor (VEGF)
 Wnt Signaling Pathway

In platelets 
The alpha granules in blood platelets contain growth factors PDGF, IGF-1, EGF, and TGF-β which begin healing of wounds by attracting and activating macrophages, fibroblasts, and endothelial cells.

Uses in medicine 
For the last two decades, growth factors have been increasingly used in the treatment of hematologic and oncologic diseases and cardiovascular diseases such as:

 neutropenia
 myelodysplastic syndrome (MDS)
 leukemias
 aplastic anaemia
 bone marrow transplantation
 angiogenesis for cardiovascular diseases

See also 
 Angiogenesis
 Bone growth factor
 Cytokine
 Growth factor receptor
 Human Genome Organisation
 Mitogen
 Neurotrophic factor
 Receptor (biochemistry)
 Signal transduction
 Wound healing#Overview of involved growth factors

References

External links 
 
 FGF5 in Hair Tonic Products
 FGF1 in Cosmetic Products

Immune system